The 2001 Britannic Asset Management International Championships was a women's tennis tournament played on grass courts at the Eastbourne Tennis Centre in Eastbourne in the United Kingdom that was part of Tier II of the 2001 WTA Tour. It was the 27th edition of the tournament and was held from 18 through 24 June 2001. Lindsay Davenport won the singles title.

Finals

Singles

 Lindsay Davenport defeated  Magüi Serna 6–2, 6–0
 It was Davenport's 3rd singles title of the year and the 33rd of her career.

Doubles

 Lisa Raymond /  Rennae Stubbs defeated  Cara Black /  Elena Likhovtseva 6–2, 6–2
 It was Raymond's 4th doubles title of the year and the 22nd of her career. It was Stubbs' 4th doubles title of the year and the 28th of her career.

External links
 ITF Tournament Profile

References

Britannic Asset Management International Championships
Eastbourne International
2001 in English women's sport
June 2001 sports events in the United Kingdom
2001 in English tennis